Phryganodes attenuata is a moth in the family Crambidae. It was described by George Hampson in 1899. It is found on Indonesia's Ambon Island.

References

Spilomelinae
Moths described in 1899